Chaunacops is a genus of lophiiform fish (anglerfish) in the family Chaunacidae. They are characterized as having globose heads, open sensory and lateral line canals, and loose skin covered by small spine-like scales. Colour, which has been noted as an important distinguishing characteristic, has generally been described as pink, reddish orange, or rose (Garman, 1899; Caruso, 1989b). However, recent work by Lundsten et al. (2012) suggests that juvenile Chaunacops coloratus may be blue and only adults are red or rose coloured.

Chaunacops coloratus was first described in 1899 from a dead specimen collected during the US Albatross Expedition of 1891 at the Cocos Ridge collecting station.  It is a deep-sea species of the order Lophiiformes (anglerfishes).This species is benthic, living at reported depths from 1789 to 3297 m in the east Indian and eastern Pacific oceans. It was first filmed alive at the seafloor at Davidson and Taney Seamounts in the northeast Pacific Ocean by scientists from Monterey Bay Aquarium Research Institute (MBARI), California, US, using a remote-controlled vehicle. As with all members of the Lophiiformes, these fish use lures to attract prey.

Many Specimens of Chaunacops are being collected from Eastern and Western Australia.

Species
There are currently 4 recognized species in this genus:

 Chaunacops coloratus Garman, 1899
 Chaunacops melanostomus J. H. Caruso, 1989 (Tadpole coffinfish)
 Chaunacops roseus T. Barbour, 1941
 Chaunacops spinosus H.-C. Ho & McGrouther, 2015 (Eastern tadpole coffinfish)

References

External links
Mbari.org
BBC.co.uk 

Chaunacidae
Marine fish genera
Taxa named by Samuel Garman